Kalkushk (also Romanized as Kalkūshk, Kalkūshak, and Kal Kūshk) is a village in Osmanvand Rural District, Firuzabad District, Kermanshah County, Kermanshah Province, Iran. At the 2006 census, its population was 41, in 10 families.

References 

Populated places in Kermanshah County